Middle Sackville is a Canadian rural community in Westmorland County, New Brunswick.  Located in the Sackville Parish approximately 3 kilometres southwest of Sackville

History

It is home to the historic Middle Braevale Manor and one of the province's largest potteries Atlantic Pottery.

Notable people

See also
List of communities in New Brunswick

References

Communities in Westmorland County, New Brunswick